This is a list of town tramway systems in the United Kingdom divided by constituent country and by regions of England. It includes all tram systems, past and present. Where known, the track gauge is indicated in the 'Notes' column.

Most of these systems have closed, but a list of the remaining systems can be found at list of trams in the United Kingdom.

England, by region

East Midlands

East Of England

Greater London

Note: Horse tramways existed as several unconnected systems north of the Thames, a system (owned and operated by several undertakings) south of the River Thames, and two unconnected systems at Croydon.

Electric tramways – Inner London

Note: The LCC tramway system was assembled from predecessors including fourteen municipal and three company undertakings. Tramways were not built in the City of London and the West End of London because of local opposition. The South London system had segments north of the Thames, notably the Victoria Embankment. However, this system was not connected to the North London system until construction of the Kingsway tramway subway. Reintroduction planned: (Cross River Tram scheme), Camden Town / Kings Cross–Euston–Waterloo–Brixton / Peckham .

Other electric tramway operators

North East England

North West England

South East England

South West England

West Midlands

Yorkshire and the Humber

Scotland

Wales

North Wales

South Wales

Northern Ireland

Note for Giant's Causeway Tramway: Portrush–Bushmills opened 29 January 1883. Bushmills–Giant's Causeway opened 1 July 1887. World's first use of electric traction with hydroelectric generation. Track built in street in Portrush.

Crown dependencies
List of town tramway systems in Europe – Isle of Man

See also
List of trolleybus systems in the United Kingdom
List of modern tramway and light rail systems in the United Kingdom
List of town tramway systems in Scotland
List of town tramway systems in Europe
List of town tramway systems
List of tram and light rail transit systems
Lists of rapid transit systems
List of trolleybus systems

Notes

References

 List
United Kingdom
Tramways